Harvey Milk High School (HMHS) is a public high school in the East Village of Lower Manhattan in New York City designed for, though not limited to, gay, lesbian, bisexual, and transgender young people, as well as those questioning their sexuality and gender identity. It is named after San Francisco, California supervisor Harvey Milk, the first openly gay man to be elected to a public office in the United States.

History
The school was originally run by the Hetrick-Martin Institute (HMI), an organization that provides social support to at-risk LGBT youth. After becoming a fully accredited public school in 2002/3, the high school is now administered by the New York City Department of Education, separate from HMI. The school and the non-profit still share space in the same building, with the HMI providing a majority of the school's arts and culture programming.

The school was founded in 1985 as a small, two-room program with just over a dozen students by HMI in collaboration with the New York City Department of Education's Career Education Center. The Department of Education administers the school and is responsible for admissions.  Harvey Milk was created as an alternative education program for youth who find it difficult or impossible to attend their home schools due to threats, violence, or harassment.

Expansion
HHS came to national attention in 2002, when the Board of Education authorized a $3.2 million capital expansion of the school as one of its last acts prior to becoming a mayoral agency.

The capital provided by the Board of Education allowed for the renovation of the school building. Enrollment jumped from 50 to 100 students. In 2003 William Salzman, the principal of the school, said it would be "academically challenging". Michael Long, chairman of the Conservative Party of New York State, was critical, and asked: "Is there a different way to teach homosexuals?  Is there gay math?  This is wrong... There’s no reason these children should be treated separately."

Supporters contend that this school is a pragmatic solution, providing an alternative path to a diploma for students who are unable to succeed in a mainstream high school due to intolerance. Not all arguments against the school are divided along partisan lines. Independent mayor Michael Bloomberg supported the renovation of the school while Democratic N.Y. State Senator Rubén Díaz opposed it.

In 2004, the HMHS underwent a 17,000 square foot (1,600 m²) expansion and an increase to eight classrooms and 110 students.

In 2015, the producers of the Broadway musical Hedwig and the Angry Inch donated over $600,000 from ticket sales to HMI, making it its biggest donation from an organization. Prior to this the musical production has contributed portions of their CD sales of "Wig In A Box: Songs From and Inspired by Hedwig and The Angry Inch" starting in 2003, followed by their film entitled "Follow My Voice," a documentary of Harvey Milk High School and the making of the CD album in 2006.

See also
Education in New York City
LGBT culture in New York City
EAGLES Academy
Walt Whitman Community School
Harvey Milk Day

Notes

External links

 Official website
 NYC DOE Portal
 "Classes open at gay high school" – CNN
 Boston Phoenix synopsis of the school's role
 "Queer High School Opens to Cheers and Jeers", The Indypendent, September 9, 2003
 Hetrick-Martin Institute

Alternative schools in the United States
Educational institutions established in 1985
LGBT organizations based in New York City
Public high schools in Manhattan
High School
1985 establishments in New York City
1985 in LGBT history
LGBT and education